The 1993 Coney Island Ice Cream Stars season was the sixth season of the franchise in the Philippine Basketball Association (PBA). It changed its team name to Purefoods Oodles Flavor Noodles in the Commissioner's Cup and returned to Purefoods Tender Juicy Hotdogs in the Governor's Cup.

Draft picks

Summary
Under new coach Chot Reyes, the Coney Island Ice Cream Stars bolster its lineup with the acquisition of veterans Frankie Lim of Alaska and Abe King of the defunct Presto ballclub and signing up four rookies. The Stars carry a 6-4 won-loss card at the end of the eliminations. After dropping their first game in the quarterfinals to Swift, the Stars won six straight matches, including a 3-0 sweep over the Swift Mighty Meaties in their best-of-five semifinals duel to arrange a return meeting with defending champion San Miguel Beermen for the All-Filipino crown. 

Coney Island won the All-Filipino Cup trophy by defeating the powerhouse San Miguel Beermen, four games to two, in the best-of-seven series. Coach Chot Reyes became the first rookie coach to steer his team to a title. The finals victory was the first by the Purefoods franchise over the Beermen in the championship series.

Purefoods lost their first two games in the Commissioner’s Cup with Anthony Dewayne Jones as their import. Jones was replaced by Carey Scurry, who led the Oodles to eight wins out of nine games he played. Starting the semifinal round, the Oodles decided to replaced Scurry with Ronnie Grandison, who scored only nine points in his PBA debut as Purefoods lost to Swift, 88-90 on August 1. The Oodles had to beat Alaska in the last day of the semifinals to earn a playoff for a finals berth. The Oodles defeated the San Miguel Beermen, 119-101, in the knockout game and advance to the finals for the second time in the season. They lost their bid for a second straight championship when they bowed to Ronnie Thompkins-powered Swift Mighty Meaties in six games for the Commissioner's Cup title. 

Returning to their old name Purefoods Tender Juicy Hotdogs in the Governor's Cup, the Hotdogs had former 76er and LA Clipper Tharon Mayes as their import, who was describe by coach Chot Reyes as a match for Swift’s Tony Harris.  Purefoods were tied at second place with Swift with a 7-3 won-loss slate and a game behind top-seeded San Miguel Beermen. After winning their first two games in the semifinals, the Hotdogs lost their last six assignments and were out of contention from the finals race.

Awards
Alvin Patrimonio won his second Most Valuable Player (MVP) trophy in three years. 
Jerry Codiñera and Alvin Patrimonio were named in the Mythical first team selection.

Roster

Transactions

Additions

Recruited imports

Win–loss record

External links
Purefoods Basketball: Purefoods Current News and Updates

References

Magnolia Hotshots seasons
Coney